The California Chamber of Commerce (CalChamber) is the largest broad-based business advocacy group in California. Membership represents one-quarter of the private sector jobs in California and includes firms of all sizes and companies from every industry within the state. The CalChamber provides products and services to help businesses and human resources (HR) professionals comply with both federal and state employment law. As a not-for-profit organization with roots dating to 1890, the CalChamber promotes international trade and investment to stimulate California's economy and create jobs.

CalChamber has over 14,000 members, who collectively employ one quarter of the private sector workforce in California. Three-quarters of CalChamber's members have 100 or fewer employees.

Board of directors
The members of the CalChamber's Board of Directors are elected by the CalChamber's members and are ranking executives in their organizations, representing many of the state's leading firms and industries, as well as the small business segment.

Jennifer Barrera has served as President and CEO of CalChamber since October 1, 2021.

History 
The CalChamber traces its roots directly to the California State Board of Trade, which incorporated on February 20, 1890 after three years as a voluntary organization. The primary goal of the organization in those early years was to encourage immigration to California, a goal of the State Board of Trade pursued by publishing and circulating statistical and other descriptive information on the growth and products of the state.

In an effort to more effectively promote the business of the state, the California State Board of Trade merged with the Manufacturers and Producers Association of California and the California Promotion Committee in 1910. The new combined group, known as the California Development Board, carried out the aims of its parent groups. The board continued to promote immigration to California, the main focus of the Board of Trade. It encouraged pride in California-made products, as had the Manufacturers and Producers Association. It also disseminated information about the state, as had the California Promotion Committee.

To better deal with the complexities of supporting a sound business climate in a rapidly growing state, the California Development Board merged with the California Industries Association in 1921 to form the California Development Association, Commerce and Industry. In September 1929, the organization incorporated as the California State Chamber of Commerce, Agriculture and Industry.

In 1972, the Board of Directors adopted the shorter name: California Chamber of Commerce.

Advocacy projects
Among other positions, the Chamber advocates against increases in unemployment insurance costs and taxes.

Job Killers 
Each year, the CalChamber releases a list of "job killer" bills to identify legislation that will, in the chamber's view, hurt economic and job growth in California. [8]♙. The CalChamber tracks the bills throughout the rest of the legislative session and works to educate legislators about the serious consequences these bills will have on the state. Updates on the "job killers" appear on its website.

 2021 "job killers" - 25 job killer bills identified, 2 sent to Governor Gavin Newsom, 1 signed, 1 vetoed 
 2020 "job killers" - 19 job killer bills identified, 2 sent to Governor Newsom , 1 signed, 1 vetoed 
 2019 "job killers" - 31 job killer bills identified, 2 sent to Governor Newsom, 1 signed, 1 vetoed 
 2018 "job killers" - 29 job killer bills identified, 1 sent to Governor Brown, 1 vetoed 
 2017 "job killers" - 27 job killer bills identified, 3 sent to Governor Brown, 1 vetoed 
 2016 "job killers" - 24 job killer bills identified, 5 sent to Governor Brown, 1 vetoed 
 2015 "job killers" - 19 job killer bills identified, 3 sent to Governor Brown, 2 vetoed 
 2014 "job killers" - 27 job killer bills identified, 2 sent to Governor Brown, 2 signed 
 2013 "job killers" - 38 job killer bills identified, 1 sent to Governor Brown, 1 signed 
 2012 "job killers" - 32 job killer bills identified, 6 sent to Governor Brown, 2 vetoed 
 2011 "job killers" - 30 job killer bills identified, 5 sent to Governor Edmund G. Brown Jr., 4 vetoed   
 2010 "job killers" - 43 job killer bills identified, 12 sent to Governor Schwarzenegger, 10 vetoed 
 2009 "job killers" - 33 job killer bills identified, 6 sent to Governor Schwarzenegger, 6 vetoed 
 2008 "job killers" - 39 job killer bills identified, 10 sent to Governor Schwarzenegger, 9 vetoed 
 2007 "job killers" - 30 job killer bills identified, 12 sent to Governor Schwarzenegger, 12 vetoed 
 2006 "job killers" - 40 job killer bills identified, 11 sent to Governor Schwarzenegger, 9 vetoed 
 2005 "job killers" - 45 job killer bills identified, 8 sent to Governor Schwarzenegger, 7 vetoed 
 2004 "job killers" - 23 job killer bills identified; 10 sent to Governor Arnold Schwarzenegger, 10 vetoed

External links 
 California Chamber of Commerce
 CAJobKillers.com: CalChamber's website tracking legislative proposals that would hurt employers and the economy.
 Western Association of Chamber Executives: an education and professional development association for chamber executives and staff.
 Grassroots: Also known as ImpactCalifornia.com - highlights CalChamber priority bills, legislative action items, position letters.
 HRCalifornia
 CalChamber Store

References 

Chambers of commerce in California
Non-profit organizations based in California
Organizations based in Sacramento, California
Organizations established in 1890
1890 establishments in California